Sam Witmitz (born 17 March 1985) is an Australian former professional cyclist.

Major results

2009
 4th Time trial, Oceania Road Championships
2010
 2nd Overall Melaka Governor's Cup
2014
 1st  Overall Tour of Taihu Lake
1st  Points classification
1st Stages 3, 6 & 7
 9th Tour of Yancheng Coastal Wetlands

References

External links

1985 births
Living people
Australian male cyclists